The Folda or Folla is a fjord in Nordland county, Norway. The fjord is located in the municipalities of Bodø, Steigen, and Sørfold.

The Folda fjord has many fjord arms which split off from the main fjord. There are two main inland branches: the Nordfolda (in Steigen Municipality) and the Sørfolda (in Bodø and Sørfold municipalities).

See also
 List of Norwegian fjords

References

Fjords of Nordland
Sørfold
Steigen
Bodø